Delusion is a 2016 Chinese-Hong Kong suspense thriller film directed by Danny Pang Phat and starring Pakho Chau, An Hu, Cici and Cheng Yuanyuan. It was released in China by Huace Pictures on May 6, 2016.

Plot

Cast
Pakho Chau
An Hu
Cici
Cheng Yuanyuan
Timmy Hung

Reception
The film grossed  at the Chinese box office.

References

Films directed by Danny Pang
Chinese thriller films
Hong Kong thriller films
2016 thriller films
Chinese suspense films
2010s Mandarin-language films
2010s Hong Kong films